The Generation Change is a centre-left political party in Cyprus led by Anna Theologou.

History 
The Generation Change was founded under the name "Independents" on October 30, 2019, as a political platform, with the participation of the independent MP Anna Theologou, who left the Citizens' Alliance in 2018.

Just before the 2021 legislative election, the Independents announced their cooperation with the Movement of United Cypriot Hunters in November 2020, with the participation of its executives on the ballot papers. However, the co-operation of the two parties ended in April 2021. In the election, they managed to win 2.82% of the popular vote, losing their one seat in the House of Representatives.

Electoral results

References

External links 
 Official website

Political parties established in 2019
2019 establishments
Liberal parties in Europe
Political parties in Cyprus